Catherine Lemorton is a French pharmacist and politician.  She was a member of the National Assembly of France, representing Haute-Garonne's 1st constituency, based in Toulouse, as a member of the Socialist party from 2007 to 2017.
She won the 2007 election, defeating Jean-Luc Moudenc who was mayor of Toulouse at the time.

Parliamentary action
Catherine Lemorton is known for her report (la prescription, la consommation et la fiscalité des médicaments) on pharmaceutical drugs, regarded as taking part in a fight against the lobbies of the pharmaceutical industry and the conflicts of interest in medicament's policies.

References

1961 births
Living people
People from Troyes
Socialist Party (France) politicians
Women members of the National Assembly (France)
Deputies of the 13th National Assembly of the French Fifth Republic
Deputies of the 14th National Assembly of the French Fifth Republic
21st-century French women politicians